The Carpenters' DVD Interpretations: A 25th Anniversary Celebration was originally released as a cassette tape and VHS tape in 1995 until 2003, with an updated release on DVD. The DVD primarily contains footage from the Carpenters' five TV specials and TV series from 1971 to 1980. It followed the compilation album of the same name, which had been released earlier the same year.

Track listings
"Without a Song" – from the TV special Music, Music, Music! – air date: May 16, 1980
"Superstar" – from the TV special The Fifth Dimension's Traveling Sunshine Show – air date: August 18, 1971
"Rainy Days and Mondays" – from the TV series Make Your Own Kind of Music – air date: July 20, 1971
"(A Place to) Hideaway" – from the TV series Make Your Own Kind of Music – air date: July 20, 1971
"Ticket to Ride" – from the TV series Something Else – air date: 1970
"Reason to Believe" – from the TV series Make Your Own Kind of Music – air date: September 7, 1971
"(They Long to Be) Close to You" – from the TV series The Don Knotts Show – air date: September 15, 1970
"Calling Occupants of Interplanetary Craft" – from the TV special Space Encounters – air date: May 17, 1978
"Little Girl Blue" – from the TV special Space Encounters – air date: May 17, 1978
"Bless the Beasts and Children" – from the TV series Make Your Own Kind of Music – air date: August 31, 1971
"Please Mr. Postman" – promotional video – air date: 1975
"We've Only Just Begun" – from the TV series Make Your Own Kind of Music – air date: September 7, 1971
"When I Fall in Love" – from the TV special Music, Music, Music! – air date: May 6, 1980
"Ave Maria" – from the TV special A Christmas Portrait – air date: December 19, 1978
"From This Moment On" – previously unreleased outtake from the TV special Music, Music, Music! (air date: May 6, 1980)

Certifications and sales

References

The Carpenters video albums